Rima (Arabic: ريما) is a Syrian village in the Yabrud District of the Rif Dimashq Governorate. According to the Syria Central Bureau of Statistics (CBS), Rima had a population of 1,034 in the 2004 census.

References

External links

Populated places in Yabroud District